James Talcott (1835–1916) was an American factor, based in New York City, New York. He established James Talcott, Inc., one of the oldest and largest 19th-century factoring houses in the United States.

Career
Talcott began his business career in 1854 in New York as a selling agent for a knitting mill in New Britain, Connecticut.  The mill was managed by his brother, John Butler Talcott. In 1859, he became a dry goods merchant, surviving the Panic of 1873, just as he had done in 1857.

Towards the end of the 19th century, Talcott became a textile factor, later branching into coal.

Talcott's son was Harvard graduate James Frederick (1866–1944), who joined his father's business full time in 1879. Two years after his son's birth, Talcott moved his dry goods business into what is now known as the James Talcott Company Building, at 108–110 Franklin Street in Manhattan. The business remained there for about fifty years, before moving to Park Avenue in 1911.

In the late 1930s, J. Frederick's son and James Talcott's grandson, James Talcott Jr. (1893–1983), was an officer of the company. This expansion was necessary, for the company's volume had grown from $11.2 million in 1926 to $82 million a decade later. Nearly a quarter of this volume consisted of refactoring (that is, receivables purchased from other factoring establishments). Talcott Jr. succeeded his father as president of the company upon his death in 1944, having joined in 1916. He became its chairman in the 1950s.

Personal life

Talcott was born on a thousand-acre farm in West Hartford, Connecticut, in 1835. He attended Williston Seminary, where he studied philosophy.

He was married to Henrietta E. Francis, who survived him by six years following his death in 1916 at the age of 86.

In 1921, a year after a donation of around $250,000 from Henrietta, the Church of Sweden in New York, on East 48th Street, was rebuilt in a Gothic style. The new building was the work of architect Wilfred E. Anthony (1878–1948). Henrietta died in December 1921, aged 79; it is not known whether she got to see the finished building.

Talcott's nephew was Allen Butler Talcott.

Philanthropy
Throughout his life, Talcott gave at least ten percent of his income to charity. In addition to his mission work, he funded an arboretum at Mount Holyoke College, a library in West Hartford, a women's dormitory at Oberlin College and a hospital in China.

Along with Dwight L. Moody, Talcott was also a founder and trustee of Northfield Seminary in Massachusetts, and he and his wife funded a professorship at Barnard College. His wife was also a founder of the YWCA, while James was on the international committee of the YMCA.

References

1835 births
People from West Hartford, Connecticut
1916 deaths
Businesspeople from Connecticut
Williston Northampton School alumni